The Ufita is a river of Campania, in southern Italy. The source is in the Baronia traditional sub-region of Irpinia, in the province of Avellino, after which the river flows generally north-westwards, entering the province of Benevento before entering the Calore Irpino  in the territory of Sant'Arcangelo Trimonte.

Rivers of Italy
Rivers of the Province of Avellino
Rivers of the Province of Benevento
Rivers of the Apennines